Aleptina aleptivoides is a moth in the family Noctuidae (the owlet moths) first described by William Barnes and James Halliday McDunnough in 1912. It is found in North America.

The MONA or Hodges number for Aleptina aleptivoides is 9072.

References

Further reading

 
 
 

Amphipyrinae
Articles created by Qbugbot
Moths described in 1912